"Star of the Show" is a song recorded by American country music singer Thomas Rhett. It was released to country radio on October 3, 2016 via Valory Music Group as the fifth single from his second studio album, Tangled Up. Rhett wrote the song with his father Rhett Akins and Ben Hayslip. The song is featured on the 2016 deluxe edition of the album.

Critical reception
Billy Dukes of Taste of Country wrote that "the guitar licks and Rhett's bashful delivery stay true to songs on his latest album, especially "Die a Happy Man," and also praised the songwriters for painting "vivid, relatable pictures." Kelly Brickey of Sounds Like Nashville described the love song as "swoon-worthy and groovy enough to warrant radio airplay."

Commercial performance
"Star of the Show" was the most-added song at American country radio the week of its release and debuted at number 38 on the Billboard Country Airplay chart dated October 15, 2016. It has since become Rhett's seventh number one single. The song also debuted at number 21 on the Hot Country Songs chart dated October 22, 2016. It also debuted at number 88 on the US Billboard Hot 100 chart for the week of November 22, 2016. The song has sold 249,000 copies in the United States as of March 2017.

In Canada, the song debuted at number 37 on Canada Country chart for the week of November 30, 2016.

Music video
The music video was directed by Roger Pistole and premiered on CMT, GAC and Vevo in November 2016.

Chart performance

Weekly charts

Year-end charts

Certifications

Release history

References

2015 songs
2016 singles
Thomas Rhett songs
Big Machine Records singles
Songs written by Thomas Rhett
Songs written by Rhett Akins
Songs written by Ben Hayslip